Puerto Deseado Airport  is an airport serving Puerto Deseado, a port town at the mouth of the Deseado River in the Santa Cruz Province of Argentina. , no scheduled services are operated.

The Puerto Deseado non-directional beacon (Ident: ADO) is located on the field.

See also 

List of airports in Argentina
Transport in Argentina

References

External links
OpenStreetMap - Puerto Deseado Airport
SkyVector - Puerto Deseado Airport

Airports in Argentina